The second HMS Louis (K515) was a British Captain-class frigate of the Royal Navy in commission during World War II. Originally constructed as the United States Navy Evarts-class destroyer escort DE-517, she served in the Royal Navy from 1943 to 1946.

Construction and transfer
The ship was laid down by the Boston Navy Yard in Boston, Massachusetts, on 9 July 1943 as the unnamed U.S. Navy destroyer escort DE-517 and launched on 13 August 1943. The United States transferred the ship to the United Kingdom under Lend-Lease on 9 November 1943.

Service history
The ship was commissioned into service in the Royal Navy as HMS Louis (K515) on 9 November 1943 simultaneously with her transfer. She served on antisubmarine patrol and convoy escort duty in the Bay of Biscay, North Atlantic Ocean, and Arctic Ocean. On 24 August 1944, she sank the German submarine U-445 with depth charges in the Bay of Biscay west of St. Nazaire, France, at position .

The Royal Navy returned Louis to the U.S. Navy at the Philadelphia Naval Shipyard in Philadelphia, Pennsylvania, on 20 March 1946.

Disposal
The United States Government sold Louis to the Commonwealth of Pennsylvania on 17 June 1946.

References

Navsource Online: Destroyer Escort Photo Archive DE-517 HMS Louis (K-515)
uboat.net HMS Louis (K 515)
Captain Class Frigate Association HMS Louis K515 (DE 517)

External links
 Photo gallery of HMS Louis (K515)

 

Captain-class frigates
Evarts-class destroyer escorts
World War II frigates of the United Kingdom
World War II frigates and destroyer escorts of the United States
Ships built in Boston
1943 ships